Alicia Martinez is a paralympic athlete from Spain competing mainly in category T37 sprint events.

Alicia was part of the Spanish athletics team at both the 1996 and 2000 Summer Paralympics.  In 1996 she finished seventh in the 100m and won a bronze medal in the 200m.  In Sydney in 2000 she improved to fifth in the 100m but slipped back in the 200m and did not make the final and finished sixth in the 400m.

References

External links
 

Paralympic athletes of Spain
Athletes (track and field) at the 1996 Summer Paralympics
Athletes (track and field) at the 2000 Summer Paralympics
Paralympic bronze medalists for Spain
Living people
Medalists at the 1996 Summer Paralympics
Year of birth missing (living people)
Paralympic medalists in athletics (track and field)
Spanish female sprinters